Thomas Caldwell VC (10 February 1894 – 6 June 1969) was a Scottish recipient of the Victoria Cross, the highest and most prestigious award for gallantry in the face of the enemy that can be awarded to British and Commonwealth forces.

Caldwell was 24 years old, and a sergeant in the 12th (Ayr & Lanark Yeomanry) Battalion, the Royal Scots Fusiliers, British Army during the First World War when the following deed took place for which he was awarded the VC.  The full citation was published in a supplement to the London Gazette of 3 January 1919 (dated 6 January 1919) and read:

He later achieved the rank of company sergeant-major. 

His Victoria Cross is displayed at the Museum of The Royal Highland Fusiliers in Glasgow.

References

Monuments to Courage (David Harvey, 1999)
The Register of the Victoria Cross (This England, 1997)
Scotland's Forgotten Valour (Graham Ross, 1995)
VCs of the First World War - The Final Days 1918 (Gerald Gliddon, 2000)

External links
 

British World War I recipients of the Victoria Cross
Royal Scots Fusiliers soldiers
British Army personnel of World War I
1894 births
1969 deaths
People from Carluke
Scottish emigrants to Australia
British Army recipients of the Victoria Cross
Burials in South Australia